Akhta (Axta) is a rural locality (a village) in Starokurmashevsky Selsoviet, Kushnarenkovsky District, Bashkortostan, Russia. The population was 73 as of 2010. There is 1 street.

Geography 
Akhta is located 11 km southwest of Kushnarenkovo (the district's administrative centre) by road. Novye Tukmakly is the nearest rural locality.

References 

Rural localities in Kushnarenkovsky District